Perumbalam ) is a village in Alappuzha district in the Indian state of Kerala.

 India census, Perumbalam had a population of 9678 with 4711 males and 4967 females. The village is situated upon an island in Vembanad Lake. The island has a total land area of 6 square kilometers. It lies 600 meters to the west of the Ernakulam District of Kerala.

Location

See also
 Battle of Cochin (1504)

References

Villages in Alappuzha district